Rhynchanthus beesianus is a monocotyledonous plant species described by William Wright Smith. Rhynchanthus beesianus is part of the genus Rhynchanthus and the family Zingiberaceae. No subspecies are listed in the Catalog of Life.

References 

Zingiberoideae